Woodstock Express is a steel junior roller coaster located in Cedar Point in Sandusky, Ohio. It was built in 1999 by Vekoma.  

Woodstock Express has a 540-degree downward helix and a 270-degree downward helix. Its height is listed as 38 feet and top speed at 25mph.

References

External links
 Cedarpoint.com - Official Woodstock Express page

Roller coasters introduced in 1999
Cedar Point
Roller coasters operated by Cedar Fair
Roller coasters in Ohio
Peanuts in amusement parks